Krasheninnikov is a complex of two overlapping stratovolcanoes inside a large caldera on the eastern coast of Kamchatka Peninsula, Russia. It is located in Kronotsky Nature Reserve to the south of Lake Kronotskoye, and is named after explorer Stepan Krasheninnikov.

The tephra from the caldera's forming eruption lies on top of material from an eruption that occurred 39,000 years ago. It is believed that the two layers are related. The southern of the two cones was constructed over a 4,500 year period beginning 11,000 years ago. The northern cone formed in the same amount of time, but started forming after the southern cone was complete.

The current eruption cycle began approximately 600 years ago. The most recent eruption was around 1550 AD.

References 

Mountains of the Kamchatka Peninsula
Volcanoes of the Kamchatka Peninsula
Calderas of Russia
Stratovolcanoes of Russia
Pleistocene calderas